Liaobu is a town under the direct jurisdiction of the prefecture-level city of Dongguan, in the Pearl River Delta region of Guangdong province, China.

External links

Geography of Dongguan
Towns in Guangdong